The Atchafalaya Golf Course at Idlewild is an 18-hole championship public golf course in the southern United States, located in Patterson, Louisiana in the Atchafalaya Basin. It is a par-72  course from the gator tees.

Course history
The course was designed by von Hagge, Smelek, and Baril within the confines of Kemper Williams Park. The golf course is a member of the Louisiana Audubon Golf Trail featuring twelve golf courses around the state.

It was the home course for the Nicholls Colonels men's golf team from 2015 until 2018.

Tournaments
Atchafalaya Intercollegiate Golf Tournament (2015–2018)
2015 – Incarnate Word Cardinals
2016 – Louisiana–Monroe Warhawks     
2017 – Louisiana–Monroe Warhawks
2018 – Texas–Rio Grande Valley Vaqueros
Bayou Classic
2018
LGA Senior Four-Ball Championship
2017
LHSAA Golf Tournaments

Club facilities
The venue offers a complete practice facility.

See also
Nicholls Colonels

References

External links

College golf clubs and courses in the United States
Golf clubs and courses in Louisiana
Nicholls Colonels men's golf clubs and courses
Sports venues in Louisiana
Buildings and structures in St. Mary Parish, Louisiana
Sports venues completed in 2006
2006 establishments in Louisiana